The 1980 United States Senate election in Kentucky took place on November 4, 1980, concurrently with the U.S. presidential election as well as other elections to the United States Senate in other states as well as other elections to the United States House of Representatives and various state and local elections. Incumbent Democratic Senator Wendell Ford won re-election, defeating Republican nominee Mary Louise Foust.

Democratic primary

Candidates
Wendell Ford, incumbent Senator
Flora Stuart

Results

Republican primary

Candidates
Mary Louise Foust, former state Auditor
Granville Thomas
Jackson Andrews
Tommy Klein
Yale Lubkin
DeSota Vaught

Results

Results

See also
1980 United States Senate elections

References

1980
Kentucky
United States Senate